This is a list of Bien de Interés Cultural landmarks in Gipuzkoa, Spain.

Bienes located in several municipalities

Bienes by municipality

A

Andoain

Anoeta

Aretxabaleta

Aia

Azkoitia

Azpeitia

B

Beasain

Berástegui (Berastegi)

C

Cestona

D

Deva

E

Elgoibar

G

Guetaria

Z

Zegama

References 

Gipuzkoa